Towne Square Mall is a shopping mall located in Owensboro, Kentucky.

History 
Towne Square Mall was built by David Hocker and Alan Squitieri for $20 million, with Squitieri later being bought out. It opened on March 1, 1978, and was one of the largest shopping centers in the area. JCPenney moved to the mall from downtown. Heitman Advisory Corporation (Heitman Financial) purchased most of the malls shares in 1987. Hocker and Associates continued as management. TS Partners (Heitman Real Estate Fund III and Southwestern Bell Corporation Master Pension Trust) sold the mall for $29 million to Aronov Realty Management and NationsBank of Texas in 1998. Lakestar Properties purchased the mall for $29 million in April 2007 from Aronov Realty Management. Sears closed in December 2014.

U.S. Bank National Association foreclosed on the mall in July 2015, with the mall owing $27.6 million. Jones Lang LaSalle managed the mall as its receiver. U.S. Bank later purchased the mall at auction for almost $19 million. Kohan Retail Investment Group purchased the mall for $2.9 million in May 2018. Macy's was not part of the sale due to owning its building. Additional property purchases around the mall totaled $1.1 million. Towne Square Mall was again sold in December 2019 to Towne Square Mall Holdings LLC (TSM Holdings LLC) for $5.15 million. Management of the mall was changed to Gulfstream Commercial Services LLC, one of its owners. Macy's closed in Spring 2020. JCPenney closed later in 2020.

The former Macy's, not owned by the mall, was sold to Owensboro Indoor Sports LLC for $1.25 million in July 2020. Plans are to convert the building to a sports facility.
 Due to the COVID-19 pandemic, the plans are delayed as of January 2021.

References

External links
 Towne Square Mall official website

Shopping malls established in 1978
1978 establishments in Kentucky
Shopping malls in Kentucky
Tourist attractions in Kentucky
Buildings and structures in Owensboro, Kentucky